Namchi Monastery is a Buddhist monastery in Sikkim, northeastern India.

References

Buddhist monasteries in Sikkim
Tibetan Buddhist monasteries